Waterloo is a provincial electoral district in the Waterloo Region of Ontario, Canada that is represented in the Legislative Assembly of Ontario.

Geography
The Waterloo electoral district contains all of the city of Waterloo plus the Bridgeport neighbourhood of Kitchener.

Members of Provincial Parliament

Election results

References

External links
Map of riding for 2018 election

Ontario provincial electoral districts
Politics of Kitchener, Ontario
Politics of Waterloo, Ontario